Arius (250 or 256 – 336) was a Cyrenaic presbyter, ascetic, and priest best known for the doctrine of Arianism. His teachings about the nature of the Godhead in Christianity, which emphasized God the Father's uniqueness and Christ's subordination under the Father, and his opposition to what would become the dominant Christology (Homoousian Christology) made him a primary topic of the First Council of Nicaea convened by Emperor Constantine the Great in 325.

After the Roman Emperors Licinius and Constantine legalized and formalized Christianity, Constantine sought to unify the newly recognized Church and remove theological divisions. The Christian Church was divided by disagreements on Christology - specifically about the nature of the relationship between the first and second persons of the Trinity. Homoousian Christians, including Athanasius of Alexandria, used Arius and Arianism as epithets to describe those who disagreed with their doctrine of coequal Trinitarianism, a Christology representing God the Father and Jesus Christ the Son as "of one essence" ("consubstantial") and coeternal.

Negative writings describe Arius's theology as one imputing there was a time before the Son of God existed—that is, when only God the Father existed. Despite concerted opposition, Arian Christian churches persisted for centuries throughout Europe (especially in various Germanic kingdoms), the Middle East, and North Africa. They were suppressed by military conquest or by voluntary royal conversion between the fifth and seventh centuries.

The Son's precise relationship with the Father had been discussed for decades before Arius's advent; Arius intensified the controversy and carried it to a Church-wide audience, where others like Eusebius of Nicomedia proved much more influential in the long run. In fact, some later Arians disavowed the name, claiming not to have been familiar with the man or his specific teachings. However, because the conflict between Arius and his foes brought the issue to the theological forefront, the doctrine they said he proclaimed—though he had definitely not originated—is generally labeled as "his".

Early life and personality 

Reconstructing the life and doctrine of Arius has proven to be a difficult task, as none of his original writings survive. Emperor Constantine ordered their burning while Arius was still living, and any that survived this purge were later destroyed by his orthodox opponents. Those works which have survived are quoted in the works of churchmen who denounced him as a heretic. This leads some—but not all—scholars to question their reliability.

His father's name is given as Ammonius. Arius is believed to have been a student at the exegetical school in Antioch, where he studied under Saint Lucian. Having returned to Alexandria, Arius, according to a single source, sided with Meletius of Lycopolis in his dispute over the re-admission of those who had denied Christianity under fear of Roman torture, and was ordained a deacon under the latter's auspices. He was excommunicated by Bishop Peter of Alexandria in 311 for supporting Meletius, but under Peter's successor Achillas, Arius was re-admitted to Christian communion and in 313 made presbyter of the Baucalis district in Alexandria.

Although his character has been severely assailed by his opponents, Arius appears to have been a man of personal ascetic achievement, pure morals, and decided convictions. Paraphrasing Epiphanius of Salamis, an opponent of Arius, Catholic historian Warren H. Carroll describes him as "tall and lean, of distinguished appearance and polished address. Women doted on him, charmed by his beautiful manners, touched by his appearance of asceticism. Men were impressed by his aura of intellectual superiority."

Though Arius was also accused by his opponents of being too liberal and too loose in his theology, engaging in heresy (as defined by his opponents), some historians argue that Arius was actually quite conservative, and that he deplored how, in his view, Christian theology was being too freely mixed with Greek paganism.

The Arian controversy

Beginnings 

The Trinitarian historian Socrates of Constantinople reports that Arius sparked the controversy that bears his name when Alexander of Alexandria, who had succeeded Achillas as the Bishop of Alexandria, gave a sermon stating the similarity of the Son to the Father. Arius interpreted Alexander's speech as being a revival of Sabellianism, condemned it, and then argued that "if the Father begat the Son, he that was begotten had a beginning of existence: and from this it is evident, that there was a time when the Son was not. It therefore necessarily follows, that he [the Son] had his substance from nothing." This quote describes the essence of Arius's doctrine.

Socrates of Constantinople believed that Arius was influenced in his thinking by the teachings of Lucian of Antioch, a celebrated Christian teacher and martyr. In a letter to Patriarch Alexander of Constantinople Arius's bishop, Alexander of Alexandria, wrote that Arius derived his theology from Lucian. The express purpose of the letter was to complain about the doctrines that Arius was spreading, but his charge of heresy against Arius is vague and unsupported by other authorities. Furthermore, Alexander's language, like that of most controversialists in those days, is quite bitter and abusive. Moreover, even Alexander never accused Lucian of having taught Arianism; rather, he accused Lucian  of heretical tendencies—which apparently, according to him, were transferred to his pupil, Arius. The noted Russian historian Alexander Vasiliev refers to Lucian as "the Arius before Arius".

Supporters 
Arius enjoyed significant support and the dispute spread to other areas in the empire. He also had the support of perhaps the two most important church leaders of that time:

Eusebius of Nicomedia 
Eusebius of Nicomedia “was a supporter of Arius as long as Arius lived” (RPC Hanson, pages 30, 31). “The conventional picture of Eusebius is of an unscrupulous intriguer” (RPC Hanson, page 27). “This is of course because our knowledge of Eusebius derives almost entirely from the evidence of his bitter enemies.“ (page 27). Hanson mentions several instances displaying Eusebius’ integrity and courage (page 28) and concludes, “Eusebius certainly was a man of strong character and great ability” (page 29). “It was he who virtually took charge of the affairs of the Greek speaking Eastern Church from 328 until his death” (page 29). He encouraged the spread of the Christian faith beyond the frontiers of the Roman Empire. The version of the Christian faith which the missionaries spread was that favoured by Eusebius and not Athanasius. This serves as evidences of his zeal. (Hanson, page 29).

Eusebius of Caesarea 
“Eusebius, bishop of Caesarea in Palestine [the church historian] was certainly an early supporter of Arius” (RPC Hanson, page 46). “He was universally acknowledged to be the most scholarly bishop of his day” (page 46). “Eusebius of Caesarea … was one of the most influential authors of the fourth century” (page 860). “Neither Arius nor anti-Arians speak evil of him” (page 46). “He was made bishop of Caesarea about 313, attended the Council of Nicaea in 325” (page 47).

“We cannot accordingly describe Eusebius (of Caesarea) as a formal Arian in the sense that he knew and accepted the full logic of Arius, or of Asterius' position. But undoubtedly, he approached it nearly” (page 59).

Origen and Arius 

Like many third-century Christian scholars, Arius was influenced by the writings of Origen, widely regarded as the first great theologian of Christianity. However, while both agreed on the subordination of the Son to the Father, and Arius drew support from Origen's theories on the Logos, the two did not agree on everything. Arius clearly argued that the Logos had a beginning and that the Son, therefore, was not eternal, the Logos being the highest of the Created Order. This idea is summarized in the statement "there was a time when the Son was not." By way of contrast, Origen believed the relation of the Son to the Father had no beginning, and that the Son was "eternally generated".

Arius objected to Origen's doctrine, complaining about it in his letter to the Nicomedian Eusebius, who had also studied under Lucian. Nevertheless, despite disagreeing with Origen on this point, Arius found solace in his writings, which used expressions that favored Arius's contention that the Logos was of a different substance than the Father, and owed his existence to his Father's will. However, because Origen's theological speculations were often proffered to stimulate further inquiry rather than to put an end to any given dispute, both Arius and his opponents were able to invoke the authority of this revered (at the time) theologian during their debate.

Arius emphasized the supremacy and uniqueness of God the Father, meaning that the Father alone is infinite and eternal and almighty, and that therefore the Father's divinity must be greater than the Son's. Arius taught that the Son had a beginning, contrary to Origen, who taught that the Son was less than the Father only in power, but not in time. Arius maintained that the Son possessed neither the eternity nor the true divinity of the Father, but was rather made "God" only by the Father's permission and power, and that the Logos was rather the very first and the most perfect of God's productions, before ages.

Initial responses 

The Bishop of Alexandria exiled the presbyter following a council of local priests. Arius's supporters vehemently protested. Numerous bishops and Christian leaders of the era supported his cause, among them Eusebius of Nicomedia, who baptized Constantine the Great.

First Council of Nicaea 

The Christological debate could no longer be contained within the Alexandrian diocese. By the time Bishop Alexander finally acted against Arius, Arius's doctrine had spread far beyond his own see; it had become a topic of discussion—and disturbance—for the entire Church. The Church was now a powerful force in the Roman world, with Emperors Licinius and Constantine I having legalized it in 313 through the Edict of Milan. Emperor Constantine had taken a personal interest in several ecumenical issues, including the Donatist controversy in 316, and he wanted to bring an end to the Christological dispute. To this end, the emperor sent Hosius, bishop of Córdoba to investigate and, if possible, resolve the controversy. Hosius was armed with an open letter from the Emperor: "Wherefore let each one of you, showing consideration for the other, listen to the impartial exhortation of your fellow-servant." However, as the debate continued to rage despite Hosius's efforts, Constantine in AD 325 took an unprecedented step: he called a council to be composed of church prelates from all parts of the empire to resolve this issue, possibly at Hosius's recommendation.

All secular dioceses of the empire sent one or more representatives to the council, save for Roman Britain; the majority of the bishops came from the East. Pope Sylvester I, himself too aged to attend, sent two priests as his delegates. Arius himself attended the council, as did his bishop, Alexander. Also there were Eusebius of Caesarea, Eusebius of Nicomedia and the young deacon Athanasius, who would become the champion of the Trinitarian view ultimately adopted by the council and spend most of his life battling Arianism. Before the main conclave convened, Hosius initially met with Alexander and his supporters at Nicomedia. The council was presided over by the emperor himself, who participated in and even led some of its discussions.

At this First Council of Nicaea, 22 bishops, led by Eusebius of Nicomedia, came as supporters of Arius. Nonetheless, when some of Arius's writings were read aloud, they are reported to have been denounced as blasphemous by most participants. Those who upheld the notion that Christ was co-eternal and consubstantial with the Father were led by the bishop Alexander. Athanasius was not allowed to sit in on the Council because he was only an arch-deacon. However, Athanasius is seen as doing the legwork and concluded (according to Bishop Alexander's defense of Athanasian Trinitarianism and also according to the Nicene Creed adopted at this Council) that the Son was of the same essence (homoousios) with the Father (or one in essence with the Father), and was eternally generated from that essence of the Father. Those who instead insisted that the Son of God came after God the Father in time and substance were led by Arius the presbyter. For about two months, the two sides argued and debated, with each appealing to Scripture to justify their respective positions. Arius argued for the supremacy of God the Father, and maintained that the Son of God was simply the oldest and most beloved creature of God, made from nothing, because of being the direct offspring. Arius taught that the pre-existent Son was God's first production (the very first thing that God actually ever did in his entire eternal existence up to that point, before all ages. Thus he insisted that only God the Father had no beginning, and that the Father alone was infinite and eternal. Arius maintained that the Son had a beginning. Thus, said Arius, only the Son was directly created and begotten of God; furthermore, there was a time that he had no existence. He was capable of his own free will, said Arius, and thus "were He in the truest sense a son, He must have come after the Father, therefore the time obviously was when He was not, and hence He was a finite being." Arius appealed to Scripture, quoting verses such as John 14:28: "the Father is greater than I", as well as Colossians 1:15: "the firstborn of all creation." Thus, Arius insisted that the Father's Divinity was greater than the Son's, and that the Son was under God the Father, and not co-equal or co-eternal with him.

According to some accounts in the hagiography of Nicholas of Myra, debate at the council became so heated that at one point, Nicholas struck Arius across the face. The majority of the bishops ultimately agreed upon a creed, known thereafter as the Nicene creed. It included the word homoousios, meaning "consubstantial", or "one in essence", which was incompatible with Arius's beliefs. On June 19, 325, council and emperor issued a circular to the churches in and around Alexandria: Arius and two of his unyielding partisans (Theonas and Secundus) were deposed and exiled to Illyricum, while three other supporters—Theognis of Nicaea, Eusebius of Nicomedia and Maris of Chalcedon—affixed their signatures solely out of deference to the emperor. The following is part of the ruling made by the emperor denouncing Arius's teachings with fervor.

Exile, return, and death 

The homoousian party's victory at Nicaea was short-lived, however. Despite Arius's exile and the alleged finality of the Council's decrees, the Arian controversy recommenced at once. When Bishop Alexander died in 327, Athanasius succeeded him, despite not meeting the age requirements for a hierarch. Still committed to pacifying the conflict between Arians and Trinitarians, Constantine gradually became more lenient toward those whom the Council of Nicaea had exiled. Though he never repudiated the council or its decrees, the emperor ultimately permitted Arius (who had taken refuge in Palestine) and many of his adherents to return to their homes, once Arius had reformulated his Christology to mute the ideas found most objectionable by his critics. Athanasius was exiled following his condemnation by the First Synod of Tyre in 335 (though he was later recalled), and the Synod of Jerusalem the following year restored Arius to communion. The emperor directed Alexander of Constantinople to receive Arius, despite the bishop's objections; Bishop Alexander responded by earnestly praying that Arius might perish before this could happen.

Modern scholars consider that the subsequent death of Arius may have been the result of poisoning by his opponents. In contrast, some contemporaries of Arius asserted that the circumstances of his death were a miraculous consequence of Arius's heretical views. The latter view was evident in the account of Arius's death by a bitter enemy, Socrates Scholasticus:

The death of Arius did not end the Arian controversy, which would not be settled for centuries in some parts of the Christian world.

Arianism after Arius

Immediate aftermath 

Historians report that Constantine, who had not been baptized for most of his lifetime, was baptized on his deathbed in 337 by the Arian bishop, Eusebius of Nicomedia.

Constantius II, who succeeded Constantine, was also an Arian sympathizer. Under him, Arianism reached its high point at the Third Council of Sirmium in 357. The Seventh Arian Confession (Second Sirmium Confession) held, regarding the doctrines homoousios (of one substance) and homoiousios (of similar substance), that both were non-biblical; and that the Father is greater than the Son, a confession later dubbed the Blasphemy of Sirmium:

Following the abortive effort by Julian the Apostate to restore paganism in the empire, the emperor Valens—himself an Arian—renewed the persecution of Nicene bishops. However, Valens's successor Theodosius I ended Arianism once and for all among the elites of the Eastern Empire through a combination of imperial decree, persecution, and the calling of the Second Ecumenical Council in 381 that condemned Arius anew while reaffirming and expanding the Nicene Creed. This generally ended the influence of Arianism among the non-Germanic peoples of the Roman Empire.

Arianism in the West 

Arianism played out very differently in the Western Empire; during the reign of Constantius II, the Arian Gothic convert Ulfilas was consecrated a bishop by Eusebius of Nicomedia and sent to missionize his people. His success ensured the survival of Arianism among the Goths and Vandals until the beginning of the eighth century, when their kingdoms succumbed to the adjacent Niceans or they accepted Nicean Christianity. Arians continued to exist in North Africa, Spain and portions of Italy until they were finally suppressed during the sixth and seventh centuries.

In the 12th century, the Benedictine abbot Peter the Venerable described the Islamic prophet Muhammad as "the successor of Arius and the precursor to the Antichrist". During the Protestant Reformation, a Polish sect known as the Polish Brethren were often referred to as Arians due to their antitrinitarian doctrine.

Arianism today 
There are several contemporary Christian and Post-Christian denominations today that echo Arian thinking.

Members of the Church of Jesus Christ of Latter-day Saints (LDS Church) are sometimes accused of being Arians by their detractors. However, the Christology of the Latter-day Saints differs in several significant aspects from Arian theology.

The Jehovah's Witnesses teach that the Son is a created being, and is not actually God.

Some Christians in the Unitarian Universalist movement are influenced by Arian ideas. Contemporary Unitarian Universalist Christians often may be either Arian or Socian in their Christology, seeing Jesus as a distinctive moral figure but not equal or eternal with God the Father; or they may follow Origen's logic of Universal Salvation, and thus potentially affirm the Trinity, but assert that all are already saved.

Arius's doctrine

Introduction 

In explaining his actions against Arius, Alexander of Alexandria wrote a letter to Alexander of Constantinople and Eusebius of Nicomedia (where the emperor was then residing), detailing the errors into which he believed Arius had fallen. According to Alexander, Arius taught:

Alexander also refers to Arius's poetical Thalia:

The Logos 

The question of the exact relationship between the Father and the Son (a part of the theological science of Christology) had been raised some fifty years before Arius, when Paul of Samosata was deposed in 269 for agreeing with those who used the word homoousios (Greek for 'same substance') to express the relation between the Father and the Son. This term was thought at that time to have a Sabellian tendency, though—as events showed—this was on account of its scope not having been satisfactorily defined. In the discussion which followed Paul's deposition, Dionysius, the Bishop of Alexandria, used much the same language as Arius did later, and correspondence survives in which Pope Dionysius blames him for using such terminology. Dionysius responded with an explanation widely interpreted as vacillating. The Synod of Antioch, which condemned Paul of Samosata, had expressed its disapproval of the word homoousios in one sense, while Bishop Alexander undertook its defense in another. Although the controversy seemed to be leaning toward the opinions later championed by Arius, no firm decision had been made on the subject; in an atmosphere so intellectual as that of Alexandria, the debate seemed bound to resurface—and even intensify—at some point in the future.

Arius endorsed the following doctrines about the Son or the Word (Logos, referring to Jesus:

 that the Word (Logos) and the Father were not of the same essence;
 that the Son was a created being ( or ); and
 that the worlds were created through him, so he must have existed before them and before all time.

Extant writings 

Three surviving letters attributed to Arius are his letter to Alexander of Alexandria, his letter to Eusebius of Nicomedia, and his confession to Constantine. In addition, several letters addressed by others to Arius survive, together with brief quotations contained within the polemical works of his opponents. These quotations are often short and taken out of context, and it is difficult to tell how accurately they quote him or represent his true thinking.

The Thalia 

Arius's Thalia (literally, 'Festivity', 'banquet'), a popularized work combining prose and verse and summarizing his views on the Logos, survives in quoted fragmentary form. In the Thalia, Arius says that God's first thought was the creation of the Son, before all ages, therefore time started with the creation of the Logos or Word in Heaven (lines 1–9, 30–32); explains how the Son could still be God, even if he did not exist eternally (lines 20–23); and endeavors to explain the ultimate incomprehensibility of the Father to the Son (lines 33–39). The two available references from this work are recorded by his opponent Athanasius: the first is a report of Arius's teaching in Orations Against the Arians, 1:5-6. This paraphrase has negative comments interspersed throughout, so it is difficult to consider it as being completely reliable.

This second passage is entirely in irregular verse, and seems to be a direct quotation or a compilation of quotations; it may have been written by someone other than Athanasius, perhaps even a person sympathetic to Arius. This second quotation does not contain several statements usually attributed to Arius by his opponents, is in metrical form, and resembles other passages that have been attributed to Arius. It also contains some positive statements about the Son. But although these quotations seem reasonably accurate, their proper context is lost, so their place in Arius's larger system of thought is impossible to reconstruct.

The part of Arius's Thalia quoted in Athanasius's  is the longest extant fragment. The Opitz edition with the West translation is as follows:

Stead argued that the Thalia was written in anapestic meter, and edited the fragment to show what it would look like in anapests with different line breaks. Hanson based his translation of this fragment directly on Stead's text.

See also 
 Anomoeanism
 Arian controversy
 Arianism
 Semi-Arianism
 Nontrinitarianism
 Oneness Pentecostalism
 Unitarianism
 First Council of Nicaea

References

Works cited

General references

Primary sources 
 
 Athanasius of Alexandria. History of the Arians. Online at CCEL. Part I Part II Part III Part IV Part V Part VI Part VII Part VIII. Accessed 13 December 2009.
 
 Sozomen, Hermias. Edward Walford, Translator. The Ecclesiastical History of Sozomen. Merchantville, NJ: Evolution Publishing, 2018. Online at newadvent.org

Secondary sources 
 
 Latinovic, Vladimir. Arius Conservativus? The Question of Arius' Theological Belonging in: Studia Patristica, XCV, p. 27-42. Peeters, 2017.
 Parvis, Sara. Marcellus of Ancyra And the Lost Years of the Arian Controversy 325–345. New York: Oxford University Press, 2006.
 Rusch, William C. The Trinitarian Controversy. Sources of Early Christian Thought, 1980. 
 Schaff, Philip. "Theological Controversies and the Development of Orthodoxy". In History of the Christian Church, Vol III, Ch. IX. Online at CCEL. Accessed 13 December 2009.
 Wace, Henry. A Dictionary of Christian Biography and Literature to the End of the Sixth Century A.D., with an Account of the Principal Sects a.d Heresies. Online at CCEL. Accessed 13 December 2009.

External links

The Complete Extant Works of Arius From the Wisconsin Lutheran College website page entitled "Fourth Century Christianity".

 

256 births
336 deaths
3rd-century Arian Christians
3rd-century Christian theologians
3rd-century Romans
3rd-century writers
4th-century Arian Christians
4th-century Christian theologians
4th-century Romans
4th-century writers
Antitrinitarians
Deaths onstage
Egyptian Christian clergy
Founders of religions
Libyan Christians
People declared heretics by the first seven ecumenical councils
People excommunicated by the Catholic Church
Roman-era philosophers in Alexandria
Nature of Jesus Christ